Seaford railway station is in Seaford, East Sussex, England. The line to the station has been reduced to a single track and only one platform remains in use (previously two), though it is still numbered "platform 2". Platform 1 is still visible but the track has been removed.

Train services from the station are provided by Southern.

The London, Brighton and South Coast Railway opened Seaford station on 1 June 1864. It was designed as a through station for a proposed extension to  that was never built.

A working model of Seaford Station as it appeared in the 1920s is displayed at Seaford Museum.

Signal box
At the end of the station, there was a signal box that was used up until the mid 1980s. The box was damaged by the salt air coming from the nearby sea and the box was dangerously unstable, therefore Seaford signal box was demolished in February 2002.

Services
 the typical off-peak service pattern is two trains per hour to  via , seven days a week. Services are operated by either Class 313 or Class 377 Electric multiple units.

Gallery

References

External links

Seaford, East Sussex
DfT Category D stations
Railway stations in East Sussex
Former London, Brighton and South Coast Railway stations
Railway stations in Great Britain opened in 1864
Railway stations served by Govia Thameslink Railway